"A Girl Called Johnny" is a song from Scottish-Irish folk rock band The Waterboys, which was released in 1983 as the lead single from their debut studio album The Waterboys. The song was written by Mike Scott and produced by Rupert Hine. It reached No. 80 in the UK Singles Chart and remained in the Top 100 for three weeks.

Writing
"A Girl Called Johnny" was inspired by American singer-songwriter Patti Smith. Scott discovered Smith's musical work and poetry in 1976 and became a big fan, which led to him forming his own fanzine, Jungleland. In 1978, Scott was aware Smith was due to perform with her band at the Rainbow Theatre in London. He knew she always stayed at the Portobello Hotel and was successful in speaking to her over the phone after ringing the hotel. Smith suggested Scott come down from Scotland to see the show and write about it in his fanzine. He traveled down to London by train, with Smith providing him with a concert ticket, covering the expense of his hotel room and placing him under the care of her guitarist Lenny Kaye.

Speaking of the influence of Smith on the song, Scott told Colin Irwin of Melody Maker in 1983, "There's a line about a girl called Johnny in one of her songs, called 'Redondo Beach'. And I heard a tape she'd done and noticed that Johnny is a hero or heroine on lots of her early songs. So I thought I'd make her Johnny!"

Recording
"A Girl Called Johnny" was recorded at Farmyard Studios in May 1982. Although most of the early Waterboys' material was produced by Scott, the song was produced by Rupert Hine. Hine gave the song its Motown-inspired backbeat and saxophonist Anthony Thistlethwaite wrote his own sax lines.

Critical reception
On its release, Mike Gardner of Record Mirror commented, "This sounds like Madness taken seriously. There's the rolling piano and the wailing sax. It works until leadened lyrics shoot it down in flames. But it has a certain charm." Jim Whiteford of the Kilmarnock Standard described "A Girl Called Johnny" as "a good debut record worth attention". He noted the "same old rasping saxophone sound", but added that the song is made "distinctive" by its "tinkling honky-tonk piano" and Scott's voice.

In a review of The Waterboys, Ken Tucker of The Philadelphia Inquirer described "A Girl Called Johnny" as "a beautiful song, full of a romantic excessiveness that is endearing." Rick Shefchik of Knight-Ridder Newspapers noted the song's "jazz-blues piano figure that instantly sticks in the brain".

In a 1991 feature for the Sunday Independent, Barry Egan commented, "1982's 'A Girl Called Johnny', replete with Thistlewaite's heaven-storming saxophone break, was the first sign we received that a new star, a weird star, was soon to blaze in the firmament: Michael Scott." In a 2017 retrospective on the "best of Mike Scott", Tom Doyle of Q included "A Girl Called Johnny" as one of ten tracks on the list and described it as a "brilliant debut single with loping piano riff and lyric inspired by the attitude of Patti Smith".

Cover versions
 In 1988, British singer Sandie Shaw released a version of the song on her seventh studio album Hello Angel.

Formats

(*) "Out of Control" was recorded by Another Pretty Face for a John Peel Radio One session

Personnel
 Mike Scott – vocals, piano, electric guitar, percussion
 Anthony Thistlethwaite – saxophone, percussion 
 Nick Linden – bass
 Kevin Wilkinson – drums
 Ray Massey, Rupert Hine – percussion on "A Girl Called Johnny"
 John Caldwell – guitar and violin on "Out of Control"
 Alan Mair – bass on "Out of Control"
 Adrian Johnston – drums on "Out of Control"

Production
 Rubert Hine – producer of "A Girl Called Johnny"
 Steven Tayler – engineer on "A Girl Called Johnny"
 Mike Scott – producer of "The Late Train to Heaven", "Ready for the Monkey House" and "Somebody Might Wave Back"
 Jim Preen – engineer on "The Late Train to Heaven", "Ready for the Monkey House" and "Somebody Might Wave Back"
 Chris Lycett – producer of "Out of Control"

Other
 Panny Charrington – photography

Charts

References

1983 songs
1983 debut singles
The Waterboys songs
Songs written by Mike Scott (musician)
Song recordings produced by Rupert Hine